is a Shinto shrine located in central Nagoya, Aichi Prefecture, Japan.

History 

Tōshō-gū is dedicated to Tokugawa Ieyasu, the founder of the Tokugawa shogunate. It was built in 1619 (Genna 5) on the orders of Lord Tokugawa Yoshinao of Owari, two years after the construction of Nikkō Tōshō-gū. It was located outside Nagoya Castle in the Sannomaru enceinte, next to the Tennosha (today's Nagoya Shrine).

The Nagoya Tōshō-gū Festival was the biggest festival in Nagoya before the Second World War.

The shrine was moved from the Sannomaru enceinte of Nagoya Castle to its present location in the late 19th century. The original main hall burned during the air raids of the Pacific War. The present main hall was a mausoleum for Lord Yoshinao's consort Haruhime (春姫), which used to be located at Kenchū-ji temple, and was moved to the site in 1953 as a replacement. It is a designated cultural property of Aichi prefecture.

A model of the old shrine's main hall is kept at the Engineering Faculty of Tokyo University.

References

External links

 Homepage of Nagoya Tōshō-gū
 

Shinto shrines in Nagoya
Nagoya Castle
Buildings and structures in Japan destroyed during World War II
Religious buildings and structures completed in 1651
Tōshō-gū